Common partridge is a common name for several birds and may refer to:
 Coqui francolin, in Africa
 Grey partridge, in Eurasia